Events in the year 1567 in Norway.

Incumbents
Monarch: Frederick II

Events

 The Northern Seven Years' War: May – Swedish invasion of Norway.
 Swedish forces torched Konghelle and Sarpsborg.
 Swedish forces torches Hamar, destroying Hamar Cathedral and the bishop's fortified palace Hamarhus.
12 September – The city of Fredrikstad was established through a King's decree.

Arts and literature

Births

Deaths

See also

References